is a junction passenger railway station located in the Manpukuji neighborhood of  Asao-ku, Kawasaki, Kanagawa, Japan and operated by the private railway operator Odakyu Electric Railway.

Lines
It is also the eastern terminus of the Odakyū Tama Line.

Station layout
The station consists of three island platforms serving six tracks, with an elevated station building.

Platforms

Lines
Shin-Yurigaoka Station is served by the Odakyū Odawara Line and is also the starting point of the It is 21.5 km from the terminus of the Odawara Line at Shinjuku Station.

History
Shin Yurigaoka Station opened on 1 June 1974. The greenfield station was developed by Odakyu Railway in 1974 as a purpose built station to hold trains for expresses to overtake local trains, and as a temporary holding spot for large numbers of passengers as the closer stations and rails towards central Tokyo were a chokepoint and had land acquisition issues and protracted legal filings with residents for decades, particularly in Setagaya ward. There was no room for six parallel platforms closer to Tokyo. Due to these lawsuits, the congested Odakyū Odawara Line was even unable to acquire land by year 2000 for quad tracking on the Odawara line north of the station (in/out of Tokyo), resorting to phased expensive fixes to lack of land such as stacking rails vertically using tunnels and grade separation, finished in March 2018. Along with the station, an attached masterplanned community was coordinated by Odakyu to support the railway. The station has been planned to connect to the Yokohama Municipal Subway and proposed Kawasaki Municipal Subway lines, but the Kawasaki plan has been cancelled.

Station numbering was introduced in January 2014 with Shin-Yurigaoka being assigned station number OH23.

On 21 January 2020, Yokohama City and Kawasaki City announced the route and four new stations for the planned 6.5 km extension of the Yokohama Municipal Subway Blue Line from Azamino Station to Shin-Yurigaoka Station. Construction of this section is expected to complete by 2030.  In June 2020, the Yokohama City Transportation Bureau started environmental impact asssesment procedures of the extension project.

Passenger statistics
In fiscal 2019, the station was used by an average of 21,681 passengers daily.

The passenger figures for previous years are as shown below.

Surrounding area
Asao Ward Office
Japan Institute of the Moving Image
Showa Academia Musicae

See also
 List of railway stations in Japan

References

External links

  

Railway stations in Kanagawa Prefecture
Railway stations in Japan opened in 1974
Odakyu Odawara Line
Stations of Odakyu Electric Railway
Railway stations in Kawasaki, Kanagawa